Halococcus (common abbreviation: Hcc.) is a genus of the Halococcaceae.

Ecology 
Halococcus is a genus of extreme halophilic archaea, meaning that they require high salt levels, sometimes as high as 32% NaCl, for optimal growth. Halophiles are found mainly in inland bodies of water with high salinity, where their pigments (from a protein called rhodopsinprotein) tint the sediment bright colors. Rhodopsinprotein and other proteins serve to protect Halococcus from the extreme salinities of their environments. Because they can function under such high-salt conditions, Halococcus and similar halophilic organisms have been used in the food industry and even in skin-care products.

Halococcus is found in environments with high salt levels, mainly inland bodies of salt water, but some may be located in highly salted soil or foods. The pigmented proteins in some species cause the reddish tint found in some areas of the Dead Sea and the Great Salt Lake, especially at the end of the growing season. When under cultivation, the organisms grew best under high salinity conditions.

Genome structure 
The genome of multiple halococcus species have been sequenced. The 16s rDNA of a species has demonstrated its placement on the phylogenetic tree. Due to the organisms' potential longevity, Halococcus may be a good candidate for exploring taxonomic similarities to life found in outer space.

Cell structure and metabolism 
Halococcus species are able to survive in high-saline habitats because of chlorine pumps that maintain osmotic balance with the salinity of their habitat, and thus prevent dehydration of the cytoplasm.

The cells are cocci, 0.6–1.5 micrometres long with sulfated polysaccharide walls. The cells are organtrophic, using amino acids, organic acids, or carbohydrates for energy. In some cases, they are also able to photosynthesize.

Phylogeny
The currently accepted taxonomy is based on the List of Prokaryotic names with Standing in Nomenclature (LPSN) and National Center for Biotechnology Information (NCBI).

See also 
 List of Archaea genera

References

Further reading

Scientific journals

Scientific books

Scientific databases

External links

Archaea genera